Pointed Roofs, published in 1915, is the first work (she called it a "chapter") in Dorothy Richardson's (1873–1957) series of 13 semi-autobiographical novels titled Pilgrimage, and the first complete stream of consciousness novel published in English. The novelist May Sinclair (1863–1946) first applied the term "stream of consciousness" In a review of Pointed Roofs (The Egoist April 1918).

Miriam Henderson, the central character in Pilgrimage, is based on the author's own life between 1891 and 1915. In Pointed Roofs, seventeen years old Miriam Henderson has her first adventure as an adult teaching English at a finishing school in Hanover, Germany. Richardson herself had left home in 1891, at seventeen, to take up the post of student teacher at a school in Hanover, because of her father's financial problems.

Bibliography
 Pointed Roofs, London: Duckworth,  1915. Online text at

References

External links
 
 

Modernist novels
1915 British novels
Feminist novels
Novels set in Germany
Novels about teachers